The 1968 United States Senate election in Colorado took place on November 5, 1968. Incumbent Republican U.S. Senator Peter Dominick was re-elected to a second term in office over Democratic ex-Governor Stephen McNichols.

Democratic primary

Candidates
Stephen McNichols, former Governor of Colorado
Kenneth W. Monfort, businessman and State Representative from Greeley

Results

General election

Results

See also 
 1968 United States Senate elections

References

1968
Colorado
United States Senate